Santa María is a town and municipality in the Colombian Department of Boyacá, part of the subregion of the Neira Province.

Climate
Santa María has a tropical monsoon climate (Am) with moderate to heavy rainfall from November to March and heavy to extremely heavy rainfall from April to October. It is the second wettest place in the department of Boyacá.

References 

Municipalities of Boyacá Department